Harri Ylönen (born 21 December 1972) is a Finnish former footballer. and current manager.

References

External links
 

1972 births
Living people
Finnish footballers
People from Kuopio
Helsingin Jalkapalloklubi players
Veikkausliiga players
Finland international footballers
SK Brann players
Kuopion Palloseura players
FC Haka players
Sportfreunde Siegen players
2. Bundesliga players
Finnish expatriate footballers
Expatriate footballers in Norway
Eliteserien players
Finnish expatriate sportspeople in Norway
Association football defenders
Sportspeople from North Savo